WOG may refer to:

 Wog, a slang word with several meanings
 Kelsey Wog (born 1998), Canadian swimmer
 Lord Bloody Wog Rolo (1945–2007) Australian activist
 World of Giants a 1959 US TV series
 WOG (gas stations), Ukraine
 WOG (valving), "water, oil, and gas" PSI rating for valves at 100F
 Wog movement, anti-Scientologists
 wog, ISO 639-3 code for the Wogamusin language of Papua New Guinea

See also

 Wog Wog, NSW, Australia
 Wog Wog River, New South Wales, Australia
 Wog Wog Mountain, in the Budawang Range, New South Wales, Australia